Melaleuca sparsiflora is a shrub in the myrtle family Myrtaceae, and is endemic to the south-west of Western Australia. It generally grows in heavy soils on the edges of salt lakes and has only one or two flowers at the ends of it branches, unlike the many-flowered heads or spikes of others in the genus Melaleuca.

Description
Its leaves are arranged in alternating pairs at right angles to the ones above and below (decussate) so that the leaves are in four rows along the stems.

The stamens are arranged in five bundles around the flower, each bundle with 11 to 26 stamens.

Taxonomy and naming
Melaleuca sparsiflora was first formally described in 1847 by Nikolai Turczaninow in "Bulletin de la Société Impériale des Naturalistes de Moscou". The specific epithet (sparsiflora) is derived from the Latin words sparsus meaning "scatter" or "strew" and flos meaning "blossom" referring to small number of flowers in each inflorescence.

Distribution and habitat
Melaleuca sparsiflora occurs in and between the Marvel Loch, Oldfield River and Salmon Gums districts in the Avon Wheatbelt,  Coolgardie, Esperance Plains and Mallee biogeographic regions. It grows in eucalypt woodland and melaleuca thickets in sand, clay or loam on gentle ridges, flats and depressions, favouring the edges of salt pans.

Conservation
Melaleuca sparsiflora is listed as "not threatened" by the Government of Western Australia Department of Parks and Wildlife.

References

sparsiflora
Myrtales of Australia
Plants described in 1847
Endemic flora of Western Australia
Taxa named by Nikolai Turczaninow